Lorenzo Vaccaro (1655 – 10 August 1706) was an Italian late-Baroque sculptor. He worked in a formalized restrained style.

He was born in Naples, the son of a lawyer. He apprenticed with Cosimo Fanzago and Dionisio Lazzari.  He was a close friend of Francesco Solimena. He was murdered at Torre del Greco in August 1706.

His son Domenico Antonio Vaccaro was also a sculptor. The ceramic sculptor Giuseppe Laguidara was one of his pupils. .

Sources
 A Bozzetto by Lorenzo Vaccaro Revies by Andrew Ciechanowiecki, The Burlington Magazine (1979) p250-253

1655 births
1706 deaths
17th-century Neapolitan people
17th-century Italian sculptors
Italian male sculptors
18th-century Italian sculptors
Assassinated Italian people
18th-century Neapolitan people
18th-century Italian male artists